Niuvanniemi hospital is a state mental hospital in the Niuva district of Kuopio, Finland. Along with the other state mental hospital, Vanha Vaasa hospital, it provides forensic psychiatric services for the entire country. Niuvanniemi is the main location for secure housing and involuntary commitment of criminal patients (i.e. individuals that a court has found criminally insane), and also receives difficult-to-treat or dangerous mental patients from other hospitals. Niuvanniemi is active in forensic psychiatry research, as a clinic of University of Eastern Finland.

Niuvanniemi hospital was founded in 1885 and is the oldest psychiatric hospital still in operation in Finland. Niuvanniemi conducts about half of the court-ordered mental examinations. Niuvanniemi has 260 beds for patients, of which 12 are for minors. In 2010, 51% of patients were patients whose sentence for a serious crime has been waived due to insanity; they are committed for 8 years and 8 months on average. Other difficult-to-treat patients, transferred from other hospitals, are committed at least 3–4 years, on average 5 years and 3 months. Niuvanniemi is not a correctional institution, i.e. the inmates are mental patients, not convicts, thus there are no set time limits for detention. (Within the penal system proper, there Psykiatrinen vankisairaala with locations in Turku and Vantaa, where the patients are convicts.)

Notable patients 
 Jean Boldt †
 Kaarlo Kramsu †
 Jammu Siltavuori †
 Sanna Sillanpää

References

External links 
 Official website of Niuvanniemi hospital (in English)

Kuopio
Psychiatric hospitals in Finland